Milperra, a suburb of local government area City of Canterbury-Bankstown, is located 24 kilometres west of the Sydney central business district in the state of New South Wales, Australia, and is a part of the South Western Sydney region.

History 
Milperra is an Aboriginal word for a gathering of people. The land at Milperra was taken over by George Johnson Jr. After World War I, returning soldiers established poultry farms and vegetable gardens in the area. The area commonly known as Thorns Bush, became officially known as Bankstown Soldier Settlement in 1917. Many streets in the area are named after World War 1 battles and officers.

The Milperra College of Advanced Education was established in 1974, bringing tertiary education to south-western Sydney. It became the Macarthur Institute of Higher Education in 1983, and then became the Bankstown campus of Western Sydney University in 1989.

In September 1984, on Father's Day, members of rival motorbike gangs the Comanchero and the Bandidos had a showdown in the car park of the Milperra Viking Tavern, which is technically located in Revesby. This altercation has since been called the 'Milperra Massacre'. Six bikies (bikers) and a 14-year-old girl were killed.

Parks 
Milperra sits on the bank of the Georges River and features a number of parks and reserves along the river, including Deepwater Park, Bankstown Golf Course and Vale of Ah Reserve.

Schools 

Milperra is home to Western Sydney University Bankstown Campus.

Milperra is also home to Mount Saint Joseph, Milperra, an all-girls high school with grades 7-12.

Milperra Public School is located on Pozieres Avenue.

Commercial areas 
Milperra features a mixture of residential, commercial and industrial areas. A number of small retail strips are scattered throughout the suburb including Milperra Shopping Village on Bullecourt Avenue and Ashford Village on the corner of Bullecourt Avenue and Ashford Avenue. Another small group of shops is located on the corner of Pozieres Avenue and Amiens Avenue, opposite the public school and many commercial developments are situated along Milperra Road.

Transport 
Milperra Road is a major road on the northern border which links to Newbridge Road and Moorebank, on the western side of the Milperra Bridge, over the Georges River. The M5 South Western Motorway runs along the southern border and Henry Lawson Drive is the other major road through the area.

Notable residents 
 Robyn Denholm (born 1963), chair of Tesla, Inc., born and grew up in Milperra
 Ian Thorpe (born 1982), swimmer, grew up in Milperra

References

External links 

 How Did Your Suburb Get Its Name?
  [CC-By-SA]

Suburbs of Sydney
City of Canterbury-Bankstown